John I of Dreux (1215–1249), Count of Dreux and Braine, was the son of Robert III of Dreux and Annora (Aenor) of Saint-Valéry.

Life 
Knighted by King Louis IX of France, he accompanied the king on several campaigns, firstly in Poitou in 1242, where he fought at the Battle of Taillebourg. In 1249 he joined the king on the Seventh Crusade to Egypt, but died at Nicosia in the Kingdom of Cyprus before arriving.

In 1240 he married Marie (1220–1274), daughter of Archambaud VIII of Bourbon. They had three children:
 Robert IV (1241–1282), succeeded his father.
 Yolande, became the second wife of John I, Count of Dammartin.

References

Sources

Dreux, John I, Count of
Dreux, John I, Count of
Counts of Dreux
House of Dreux
Christians of the Sixth Crusade
Dreux, John I, Count of
Burials at the Abbey of Saint-Yved de Braine